Halocharis may refer to:
 Halocharis (plant), a genus of plants in the family Amaranthaceae
 Halocharis, a genus of wasps in the family Eulophidae, synonym of Closterocerus
 Halocharis, a genus of cnidarians in the family Zancleidae, synonym of Zanclea